Neu-Eichenberg is a municipality in the Werra-Meißner-Kreis in Hesse, Germany.

Geography

Location
Neu-Eichenberg lies near the three-state common point shared by Hesse, Thuringia and Lower Saxony between Kassel (45 km) and Göttingen (12 km).

Neighbouring communities
Neu-Eichenberg borders in the north on the community of Friedland (in Lower Saxony’s Göttingen district), in the east on the communities of Hohengandern and Bornhagen (both in Thuringia’s Eichsfeld district) and in the south and west on the town of Witzenhausen (Werra-Meißner-Kreis).

Constituent communities
Neu-Eichenberg is made up of seven places named Berge, Neuenrode, Eichenberg Bahnhof, Eichenberg Dorf, Hebenshausen (administrative seat), Hermannrode and Marzhausen, but its five Ortsteile are Berge (Berge and Neuenrode), Eichenberg (Bahnhof and Dorf), Hebenshausen, Hermannrode and Marzhausen.

History
The community of Neu-Eichenberg came into being in the course of municipal reform in Hesse on 1 February 1971 through the willing merger of the formerly self-administering communities of Berge, Eichenberg, Hebenshausen, Hermannrode and Marzhausen.

Politics

Community council

The municipal election held on 26 March 2006 yielded the following results:

Economy and infrastructure

Transport

Eichenberg’s railway station is a junction of the old North-South line and the Halle-Kassel line. There are connections to Kassel, Göttingen, Erfurt and Fulda. These are served by regional trains of Deutsche Bahn, cantus and Abellio.

The community earned special importance through the Verkehrsprojekt Deutsche Einheit (German Unity Transport Project) number 6 (rail), which saw the reconnection of the Eichenberg-Halle line formerly severed by the Inner German Border between East and West Germany.

References

External links
Community’s official webpage 
Private Portal, Neu-Eichenberg 

Werra-Meißner-Kreis